Louie Haskall Lilly (February 26, 1909 – August 9, 1999) was an American animator, screenwriter and director best known for his work on the Looney Tunes and Merrie Melodies series of cartoons from Warner Bros.

Awards
1985 Golden Award

Filmography
1947 Doctor Jim
1945 Draftee Daffy 
1944 Angel Puss
1942 The Wild and Woozy West
1942 Horton Hatches the Egg 
1941 The Merry Mouse Cafe 
1941 Dumb Like a Fox 
1941 Kitty Gets the Bird 
1941 It Happened to Crusoe 
1940 Mouse Meets Lion 
1940 Farmer Tom Thumb
1940 A Peep in the Deep 
1940 The Pooch Parade
1939 Park Your Baby 
1939 The Little Lost Sheep 
1939 Golf Chumps
1938 The Lone Mountie 
1938 Hot Dogs on Ice

Writer
1951 Front Page Detective 
1947 Doctor Jim
1946 Speaking of Animals No. Y6-1: Stork Crazy 
1946 The Lonesome Stranger
1945 Draftee Daffy
1944 Buckaroo Bugs
1944 Hare Ribbin' 
1944 Angel Puss (One of the Censored Eleven)
1944 Russian Rhapsody

Director
1946 Speaking of Animals No. Y6-1: Stork Crazy 
1946 The Lonesome Stranger 
1944 Who's Who in Animal Land 
1942 The Wild and Woozy West
1941 Speaking of Animals Down on the Farm
1941 Playing the Pied Piper

References

External links

1909 births
1999 deaths
American animators
American animated film directors
Warner Bros. Cartoons people